Sphingobacterium mucilaginosum is a Gram-negative, strictly aerobic, short rod-shaped and motile bacterium from the genus of Sphingobacterium which has been isolated from rhizosphere soil from a rose in China.

References

Sphingobacteriia
Bacteria described in 2015